The first elections to the Wolverhampton Metropolitan Borough Council were held on 10 May 1973.

Background
The metropolitan district was one of the new authorities created by the Local Government Act 1972, which completely reorganised local administration in England and Wales. The new district, one of seven in the West Midlands, had an identical area to the existing County Borough of Wolverhampton. The first council was elected as a "shadow authority", with the reorganisation coming into effect in the following year on 1 April 1974. Subsequent to the election the shadow council successfully petitioned for a royal charter granting borough status, becoming Wolverhampton Metropolitan Borough Council.

Elections
At this first election all 60 councillors were elected, there being three councillors in each of the 20 wards. In an anomaly of the usual procedure for local elections, the candidate in first place was elected for 5 years, the candidate in second place for 3 years and the candidate in third place for 2 years. This was to allow for the "shadow" year of 1974 when the Metropolitan Borough Council was operating in shadow of the County Borough. From 1975 elections were by thirds with one councillor retiring in each ward.

Following the election the Labour Party had overall control of the council with 40 councillors to the Conservatives 20. Following the final county borough election held in 1972 the two parties had held 40 seats each on the 80 member council.

Election results
The following councillors were returned in their corresponding wards:

References

1973
1973 English local elections
1970s in the West Midlands (county)